Elections to Rugby Borough Council were held on 1 May 2003. One third of the council seats were up for election.  The council stayed under no overall control.  The number of councillors for each party after the election were Conservative 18, Labour 16, Liberal Democrat 10 and Independent 4.

Election result

|}

Ward results

References

2003 English local elections
2003
2000s in Warwickshire